Salem Witch Trials is a 2003 American-Canadian historical drama miniseries directed by Joseph Sargent and starring Kirstie Alley and Alan Bates.  It is a dramatization of the Salem witch trials.

Cast
Kirstie Alley as Ann Putnam
Henry Czerny as Samuel Parris
Gloria Reuben as Tituba Indian
Jay O. Sanders as Thomas Putnam
Kristin Booth as Lizzy Porter
Katie Boland as Annie Putnam
Alan Bates as William Phips
Rebecca De Mornay as Elizabeth Parris
Peter Ustinov as William Stoughton
Shirley MacLaine as Rebecca Nurse

Production
The series was shot in Toronto and Cornwall, Ontario.

Release
The series debuted on DVD and Blu-ray on September 30, 2008 via Echo Bridge Entertainment. Neither version contains any extras.

References

External links
 
 

Films directed by Joseph Sargent
CBS network films
English-language Canadian films
Canadian television films
Salem witch trials
Films set in the 1690s
Films set in the 17th century
2003 television films
2003 films
Films shot in Toronto
2000s Canadian films